Taxidermia is a 2006 Hungarian surrealist comedy-drama horror film directed and co-written by György Pálfi. An international co-production of Hungary, Austria and France, the film spins a metaphorical socio-political retelling of Hungary's history from the Second World War to the present day.

With elements of dark comedy and body horror, the story is told by means of three generations of Hungarian men, commencing with a WWII military orderly, moving on to a Cold War-era aspiring speed-eater, and concluding with a modern day taxidermist. It received positive reviews.

Plot
At a remote Hungarian military outpost, orderly Morosgoványi Vendel lives a wretched existence of servitude beneath the heel of his lieutenant, Öreg Balatony Kálmán. Condemned to performing menial duties for the officer and his family while sleeping in an unheated shack next to the latrines, Morosgoványi frequently escapes into fantasy. So realistic are these fantasies that in one ambiguous instance, Morosgoványi sleeps with and impregnates the lieutenant's wife and "wakes up" to find himself engaged in an act of sodomy with a slaughtered pig. Upon seeing this, the lieutenant promptly executes Morosgoványi and raises the son, Balatony Kálmán, as his own.

Decades later, Kálmán has grown into a champion Hungarian speed-eater. Coached and influenced by the strict Jenő, Kálmán's life revolves around training for the eventual day when the IOC recognizes speed-eating as a legitimate sport. After a bout of lockjaw at a Soviet event and eloping with fellow speed-eating champion Aczél Gizi, Kálmán resumes his rigorous training, even as Gizi gives birth to their son, Balatony Lajoska.

Some years later, Lajoska has grown into a dedicated, professional taxidermist. In contrast to both his parents' girth, Lajoska appears pale and impoverished, with a thin anemic frame and haunted visage. When not working from his taxidermy shop or failing in his attempts to lead a normal life, Lajoska purchases groceries for his father Kálmán, who has grown so monstrously obese that he cannot leave the chair in his claustrophobic apartment. Kálmán, who feeds butter to his caged cats, has nothing but harsh words for his son who, upon reaching his breaking point, abandons his father to his own prison. Returning later, he discovers that the cats have escaped their cages and, desiring meat, have eviscerated his father.

Lajoska stuffs his father and the cats. With little left to live for, he locks himself in a homemade surgical harness and through the use of sedatives, painkillers and a heart-lung machine, begins removing his own internal organs. Pumping his body full of preservatives and sewing himself up, he activates the machine that decapitates him, leaving behind a preserved statue. His body is displayed in an exhibit alongside the cats and his father.

Cast
 Csaba Czene as Morosgoványi Vendel
 Gergely Trócsányi as Balatony Kálmán
 Piroska Molnár as Hadnagyné
 Adél Stanczel as Aczél Gizi
 Marc Bischoff as Balatony Lajoska
 István Gyuricza as Hadnagy
 Gábor Máté as Öreg Balatony Kálmán
 Zoltán Koppány as Miszlényi Béla
 Erwin Leder as Krisztián
 Éva Kuli as Leóna
 Lajos Parti Nagy as Dédnagypapa
 Attila Lőrinczy as Pap
 Mihály Pálfi as Baba

Music
The film features music scored by electronic artist Amon Tobin, released on his 2012 compilation Boxset. It additionally contains music written by the band Hollywoodoo during the end credits. The song is entitled "Erdő" (translated as "Forest") and is from the album "Karmolok, harapok" released in 2004, which directly translated from Hungarian to English means "I Scratch, I Bite". The music video is directed by Pálfi and contains many scenes from the film including copies of scenes containing various band members.

Release
Taxidermia premiered at the Hungarian Film Festival on 3 February 2006 before screening in the Un Certain Regard section at the 2006 Cannes Film Festival. It opened in France through Memento Films on 23 August 2006, Hungary on 9 November, and Austria (also in Hungary) through Pool Filmverlieh on 9 February 2007.

The film received a theatrical release, albeit limited, in the United States on 14 August 2009. It was released in two venues by Regent Releasing and grossed $11,408.

Critical reception

On review aggregator website Rotten Tomatoes, the film holds an approval rating of 81% based on 47 reviews, with an average rating of 6.68/10. The website's critical consensus reads, "Surreal and visually striking, Taxidermia is, at times, graphic and difficult to watch, but creatively touches on disturbing subjects with imagination and wit." On Metacritic, which assigns a normalized rating to reviews, the film has a weighted average score of 83 out of 100, based on 9 critics, indicating "universal acclaim". Deloret Imnidian of High on Films Website writes "Taxidermia is a delicious film for those who can digest it." in his 4.5 star rated review of the film.

See also
 Unsimulated sex

References

Taxidermia Review on High on Films

External links
  (US)
  (Hungary)
 
 
 
  
 

2006 films
2006 comedy-drama films
2006 horror films
Hungarian comedy-drama films
Hungarian horror films
Austrian comedy-drama films
Austrian horror films
French comedy-drama films
French horror films
2000s Hungarian-language films
2000s English-language films
2000s Russian-language films
Films directed by György Pálfi
2006 black comedy films
Body horror films
Films shot in Hungary
Films shot in Budapest
Hungarian independent films
2006 comedy horror films
2006 comedy films
2006 multilingual films
Hungarian multilingual films
Austrian multilingual films
French multilingual films
2000s French films